The Phantom and Dona Juanita (Spanish:El fantasma y Doña Juanita) is a 1945 Spanish comedy film directed by Rafael Gil and starring Antonio Casal, Mary Delgado and Juan Espantaleón.

The film's sets were designed by Enrique Alarcón.

Plot 
Doña Juanita is a woman who lives haunted by the spirit of a poor clown, with whom she once fell in love and who died when she was saved from certain death by a fire in the circus.

Cast

 Antonio Casal as Tony / José 
 Mary Delgado as Juanita / Rosita  
 Juan Espantaleón as Pierre Brochard  
 Alberto Romea as Don Laureano  
 Milagros Leal as Ernestina  
 Camino Garrigó as Doña Juanita  
 José Isbert as Don Pancho  
 Juan Domenech as El cura Don Elpidio  
 José Prada as Machuca  
 Joaquín Roa as El alcalde  
 José Jaspe as Amaru  
 Enrique Herreros as El faquir 
 Nicolás D. Perchicot as Sacristán  
 José Ramón Giner as El fotógrafo 
 Julio Infiesta as Gamberro #1  
 Fernando Fresno as El bombero  
 Emilio Santiago as Hombre en público  
 Juana Mansó as Gitana  
 Casimiro Hurtado as Director de pista  
 Angelita Navalón as Rosario  
 Mariana Larrabeiti as Engracia  
 José Calle as Empleado del circo 
 Manuel París as Socio del casino  
 Santiago Rivero as Gamberro #2  
 Julia Pachelo as Mujer de don Sixto Olivares  
 Manuel Requena as El barbero  
 María Cañete as Planchadora 
 Luis Rivera as Gamberro #3

References

Bibliography
 de España, Rafael. Directory of Spanish and Portuguese film-makers and films. Greenwood Press, 1994.

External links 

1945 films
1945 comedy films
Spanish comedy films
1940s Spanish-language films
Films directed by Rafael Gil
Cifesa films
Films scored by Juan Quintero Muñoz
Spanish black-and-white films
1940s Spanish films